Uday Shehab Ahmad (born 14 June 1997) is an Iraqi footballer who plays as a defender for Al-Shorta in the Iraqi Premier League.

Club career
Shehab started his career with Al-Mosul in the 2011–12 Iraqi Elite League, scoring his first goal as a 15-year old against Samaraa on 29 July 2012. After footballing activity in Mosul stopped due to ISIS, Shehab moved to Karah to compete in the Kurdistan League. He joined Ghaz Al-Shamal in 2016 to compete in the 2015–16 Iraq Division One Elite Stage, however after playing in a match against Brayati his transfer to Ghaz Al-Shamal was deemed illegitimate due to the transfer window having ended and therefore Ghaz Al-Shamal were awarded a 3–0 loss for the match and Shehab was not allowed to play for them anymore. He joined Zakho before moving to Al-Karkh in the winter transfer window of the 2016–17 season and was called up to the Iraq Olympic team in March 2017.

International career
On 7 June 2019, Shehab made his first international cap with Iraq against Tunisia in an international friendly.

References

1997 births
Living people
Iraqi footballers
Al-Shorta SC players
Iraq international footballers
Association football defenders